Second Skin is a BBC Books story adventure book written by Richard Dungworth and based on the long-running British science fiction television series Doctor Who. It features the Tenth Doctor.

This is part of the Decide Your Destiny series which makes you choose what happens in the books.

Plot
When you find yourself on a 23rd-century space station, you soon realise a dangerous alien parasite has taken over most of the people on board. Can you and the Doctor destroy it before it reaches Earth?

External links

2008 British novels
2008 science fiction novels
Decide Your Destiny gamebooks
Tenth Doctor novels